Aasramam is a 1978 Indian Malayalam film,  directed by K. K. Chandran. The film stars Dr. Mohandas, K. P. Ummer and Reena in the lead roles. The film has musical score by M. K. Arjunan.

Cast
Dr. Mohandas
K. P. Ummer
Reena

Soundtrack
The music was composed by M. K. Arjunan and the lyrics were written by Chunakkara Ramankutty.

References

External links
 

1978 films
1970s Malayalam-language films